Mezei-Vill Futsal Club Berettyóúfalu is a Hungarian futsal club from Berettyóújfalu, that plays in the Nemzeti Bajnokság I, the top division for futsal in Hungary.

Honours

Nemzeti Bajnokság I:
Winners (4): 2008, 2009, 2014, 2019
Magyar Kupa:
Winners (3): 2009, 2012, 2019
Szuperkupa:
Winners (2): 2008, 2009

Team 2022/23

Current squad

Squad for the 2022–23 season

Technical staff

Head coaches 

(x) – change during the season

References

External links
 Official website

Futsal clubs in Hungary
Futsal clubs established in 2004
Hajdú-Bihar County
Sport in Hajdú-Bihar County
2004 establishments in Hungary
Berettyóújfalu